The prime minister of Turkey, officially the prime minister of the Republic of Türkiye (Turkish: Türkiye Cumhuriyeti Başbakanı) was the head of government of the Republic of Türkiye from 1920 to 2018, who led a political coalition in the Turkish Parliament and presided over the cabinet. Throughout the political history of Turkey, functions and powers of the post have changed occasionally. Prior to its dissolution as a result of the 2017 Constitutional Referendum, the prime minister was generally the dominant figure in Turkish politics, outweighing the president.

Premiership in the Ottoman Era
In the Ottoman Empire, the prime minister of the Ottoman sultan held the title of Grand Vizier. After the Tanzimat period in the 19th century, the grand viziers came to assume a role more like that of the prime ministers of contemporary Western European monarchies. Later, with the Ottoman constitution of 1876, a parliament was established to oversee the prime minister, and the prime minister formed a cabinet. With the constitutional amendments that took place during the Second Constitutional Era, the prime minister was made answerable to the parliament rather than the sultan.

Premiership in the Government of the Grand National Assembly
After the establishment of the Grand National Assembly in Ankara by the Turkish National Movement, the 1st Parliament instituted a new government called "The Cabinet of the Executive Ministers" (Turkish: İcra Vekilleri Heyeti). The post was then held by the Speaker of the Parliament, who presided over the cabinet ex-officio.

Premiership in the Republic
One-party period (1923–1945)

Following the declaration of the republic, the existing constitution of 1921 was amended, conferring the executive authority and the privilege to oversee governmental affairs to the prime minister, who was to be appointed by the president of the republic. 

Although the Presidency was established as a symbolic office with the president being unaccountable for his actions, Presidents Atatürk and İnönü had exercised executive authority as the leader of their party during the one-party period.

Multi-party period (1945–2018) 

Prior to the general election held in 1950, the constitution was amended, disallowing the president-elect to remain the leader of their political party. These amendments resulted in the prime minister becoming the dominant figure in Turkish politics, sharply diminishing the role of the president. 

After Prime Minister Adnan Menderes was ousted from power as a result of the 1960 Turkish coup d'état, the newly promulgated Constitution of 1961 reduced the powers of the government considerably, strengthening parliamentary supervision over the cabinet. These features of the constitution resulted in a fractured political system, causing many short-lived coalition governments to be formed until 1980. 

In the aftermath of the 1980 Turkish coup d'état, the Constitution of 1982 (still in use) was implemented. Even though the Constitution of 1982 was quite similar to its predecessor, there were new measures taken to avoid the formation of short-lived coalition governments. These measures included the introduction of 10% electoral threshold, unicameral parliamentary structure, and enforced executive powers. Along with broad executive powers being vested in the post of the prime minister, the realm of authority of the cabinet ministries (with the exclusion of the prime ministry) was drastically reduced, placing the ministers under the direct supervision of the prime minister. 

Later on, numerous amendments were made on the constitution, with the ones of paramount importance being the 2007, 2010, and 2017. Some of the changes approved by public vote were highly controversial. 

According to some, the direct election of the president for the first time in 2014 resulted in a de facto transition into a semi-presidential system, bringing an end to the prime minister's dominant authority in Turkish politics. 

Following the general elections in 2018, constitutional amendments approved in the 2017 referendum officially took effect, marking the end of 98 years of parliamentary governance in Turkey.

List of prime ministers

Timeline

See also
Air transports of heads of state and government
Official state car
List of prime ministers of Turkey
President of Turkey
List of presidents of Turkey
Vice President of Turkey
Constitution of Turkey

References

External links

The Prime Minister's Office
Official Turkish Constitution

 
1920 establishments in the Ottoman Empire
2018 disestablishments in Turkey